John Colton Greene (March 5, 1917, Indianapolis, Indiana – November 12, 2008, Pacific Grove, California) was an American historian of science.

Biography
His father was a professor at the University of South Dakota. John C. Greene grew up in Vermillion, South Dakota, where he graduated in 1934 from Vermillion High School. He graduated in 1938 with a B.A. from the University of South Dakota. In 1939 he graduated with an M.A. in American history from Harvard University and continued studying there for his Ph.D. until 1942 when his academic career was interrupted by WW II. From September 1942 to April 1946 he served in the U.S. Army, travelled to five continents, and attained the rank of captain. While stationed in Teheran, he, as a first lieutenant, met Ellen Wiemann (1917–1998), a Red Cross nurse from Larchmont, New York. They married in Cairo, Egypt in November 1945. In early 1946 they returned to the United States to live in Cambridge, Massachusetts, where he studied at Harvard until 1948. Although no longer domiciled in Cambridge, Massachusetts, he eventually completed the work for his Harvard Ph.D. in history in 1952. The couple lived from 1948 to 1967 in various Midwestern university towns with one academic year (1962–1963) in Berkeley, California. During the years from 1948 to 1967, they raised three children, Ruth, Ned, and John David. John C. Greene taught from 1948 to 1952 as an instructor at the University of Chicago, from 1952 to 1956 as an assistant professor at the University of Wisconsin–Madison, from 1956 to 1962 as an associate (and then full) professor at Iowa State University, from 1962 to 1963 as a visiting professor at the University of California, Berkeley, and from 1963 to 1967 as a full professor at the University of Kansas. At the University of Connecticut, he was a full professor from 1967 until 1987, when he retired as professor emeritus. After his wife Ellen died in 1998, he moved from Storrs, Connecticut, to California, where he died in 2008.

Greene wrote several monographs and numerous essays and book reviews. His work deals with "early American science, the rise and development of evolutionary ideas in Western thought, and the historical relations of science, religion, and world view."

For the academic year 1966–1967, Greene was a Guggenheim Fellow. He was in 1974 a visiting scholar at Corpus Christi College, Cambridge and in 1978 a visiting historian at the National Museum of History and Technology, Smithsonian Institution. He was from 1975 to 1977 the president of the History of Science Society. In 1983 he was elected a fellow of the American Antiquarian Society/ In 1989 a collection of essays was dedicated to him. In 2002 he received the George Sarton Medal.

Selected publications

Articles

Books   
 
 
 
 with John G. Burke,

References

1917 births
2008 deaths
20th-century American historians
21st-century American historians
American historians of science
University of South Dakota alumni
Harvard University alumni
University of Connecticut faculty